Ernie Odoom is a Swiss Vocalist, Saxophonist and Band Leader. He was a co-founder of PPA+ and Rootman which is Thai version of PPA+. Odoom released albums for the band LeBocal, as a vocalist and saxophonist, with his friends since 2002 and developing modern-improvising on his own style.

Odoom won the Prix du Festival at Crest Vocal Jazz competition in 2004 and went on to form the piano-voice duo E'MOW and the progressive pop quartet Liquid Groovement with pianist Michel Wintsch, who is a reference in improvised music in Switzerland. In 2008, Ernie began work with a new trio, The Glenn Ferris Wheel, with Glenn Ferris on trombone and Bruno Rousselet on double bass.

As a founder of Jaydo's Jazz Cafe in Geneva, he is playing jazz music in Geneva and usually appears on European/Asian jazz stages including AMR Jazz Festival (Swiss), Thailand Jazz Conference (Thailand), Saxophone Pub (Thailand), Eden Lounge (Vietnam), Pickwick Pub (Swiss) and Blakat Jam Session in Au Chat Noir (Swiss).

Discography
Ernie Odoom began recording his full album in 1991. A list of albums featuring Ernie Odoom :

With Les Tontons Flingueurs
Mama Told Me (1991)
Voleur de Feu (1995)

With Peeping Tom
Peeping Tom (1994)

With Sao
Entre Ciel et Terre (1999)

With LeBocal
Collectif etc (2002)
Oh No !... Just Another Frank Zappa Memorial Barbecue ! (2003)
Ego (2006)
Bist du froh ? (2012)

With Pavel Pesta Re-Bop Quintet
Pavel Pesta Re-Bop Quintet (2005)

With Glenn Ferris Wheel Trio
ENJA (2009)

With William Parker
Essence of Ellington (Centering, 2012)
Wood Flute Songs (AUM Fidelity, 2013)

Recordings on his live performances :
Just Kidding, Interrogation (1999)
PPA+, Live at the Chat Noir (2002)
Croon On (2003)
L’Ilorkestra (2004)
E’MOW (2006)

A list of CD albums that Ernie was invited to be a guest artist :
Icare-SaturnSplit-32db (1997) - with Peeping Tom
Lili Lazer (1998) - with Brico Jardin
Liquid Sand (1999) - with Peeping Tom
16 Nouvelles Aventures (1999) - with Brico Jardin
Neuf (2000) - with Sandro en Compagnie
Delivering (2004) - with Actaruss 1
Pavel Pesta Re-Bop Quintet (2005)
Right Next Door (2006) - with Quartier Lointain

Sources

External links

 Ernie Odoom- official website.
 LeBocal - official Lebocal album website.
 Jaydo's Cafe - official Jaydo's jazz cafe.

Living people
Swiss jazz musicians
Year of birth missing (living people)